Chief Gabriel Osawaru Igbinedion (born 11 September 1934) is a Nigerian businessman and traditional aristocrat from Okada Town in Edo State. He holds the chieftaincy title of the Esama of the Benin Kingdom.

Esama of Benin
The title Esama traditionally means the "Son of the People", with responsibilities including assisting the poor in medial, monetary and private venture forms. He was suspended from participating in palace activities in 2008.

It is on record that the Oba of Benin did not declare Chief Gabriel Osawaru Igbinedion as an enemy as it was widely circulated. On 13 June 2012 a palace press release informed the general public that the suspension placed on Chief G.O. Igbinedion had been lifted. This was an affirmation that Gabriel Osawaru Igbinedion is still the Esama of Benin Kingdom.

The Esama of Benin's business empire includes an international property portfolio and a private TV and radio station, called Independent Radio (92.3 fm) and Television. He owns a private bank, oil refinery, diamond, gold, marble mines over Africa, a private university (Igbinedion University, the first private university in Nigeria, located at Okada town) and a large number of hotels.  He previously owned the now-defunct private airline, Okada Air, of over 40 aircraft (planes and helicopters). He has built numerous churches including a Grand Catholic Cathedral, and has set up and owns a number of private hospitals across Nigeria.

Family
Chief Igbinedion is married to Lady Cherry Igbinedion, a native of Jamaica.
His children include a son, Lucky, who was a two-term Local Government chairman and two-term Governor of Edo State, another son, Charles, who was a Local Government chairman and one time Edo State Commissioner of Education, and a third one, Peter, who was the managing director of the Nigerian Aviation Authority. His daughter, Hon. Omosede G. Igbinedion  is the former wife of Avan Akenzua, a dynastic Prince of Benin Kingdom. She is a former member of the House of Representatives in Abuja as a representative of Ovia Federal Constituency in Edo State. In addition to these four, Chief Igbinedion also has a number of other children.

External links
Official website of Gabriel Igbinedion

References

Nigerian businesspeople
Living people
1934 births
Edo people
Igbinedion family